Evy Poppe (born 2 March 2004) is a Belgian snowboarder. She won the gold medal at the 2020 Winter Youth Olympics in slopestyle.

Biography 
Poppe won a gold medal in Lausanne at the 2020 Youth Olympics. The slopestyle finals were held on 20 January 2020. Poppe earned 94.00 points in her last run. She beat Melissa Peperkamp from the Netherlands by 2.25 points. In 2021 she won the gold medal at the FIS Snowboarding Junior World Championships in slopestyle.

References

External links 

 
 
 
 Profile at the Lausanne 2020 Winter Youth Olympic Games
 

 

Living people
2004 births
Belgian female snowboarders
Place of birth missing (living people)
Snowboarders at the 2020 Winter Youth Olympics
Youth Olympic gold medalists for Belgium
Snowboarders at the 2022 Winter Olympics
Olympic snowboarders of Belgium
21st-century Belgian women